Kim Sang-su (born March 23, 1990) is South Korean professional baseball shortstop currently playing for the Samsung Lions of the KBO League. His younger brother Kim Sang-Woo is a member of the Korean boy band N-Train.

He was elected as the team's new captain following Park Han-yi on Dec. 20, 2016.

References

External links
Career statistics and player information from the KBO League

1990 births
2013 World Baseball Classic players
2015 WBSC Premier12 players
Asian Games medalists in baseball
Baseball players at the 2014 Asian Games
Sang-su
KBO League shortstops
Kyeongbuk High School alumni
Living people
Samsung Lions players
South Korean baseball players
South Korean Roman Catholics
Baseball players from Seoul
Medalists at the 2014 Asian Games
Asian Games gold medalists for South Korea